The Sins of the Children, also known as Father's Day and The Richest Man in the World, is a 1930 American pre-Code drama film, which was produced and directed by Sam Wood and distributed by Metro-Goldwyn-Mayer.

Synopsis
Adolf Wagenkampf, a German immigrant barber on the verge of becoming rich, takes his sickly son away on a two-year stay in a drier climate. The man's partner deems him a failure, but he learns that his family is more important than finance.

Cast
Louis Mann as Adolf Wagenkampf
Robert Montgomery as Nick Higginson
Elliott Nugent as Johann Wagenkampf
Leila Hyams as Alma Wagenkampf
Clara Blandick as Martha Wagenkampf
Mary Doran as Laura
Ralph Bushman as Ludwig Wagenkampf
Robert McWade as Joe Higginson
Dell Henderson as Ted Baldwin
Henry Armetta as Tony
Jane Reid as Katherine Wagenkampf Taylor
James Donlan as Bide Taylor
Jeane Wood as Muriel Stokes
Lee Kohlmar as Dr Heinrich Schmidt

External links

1930 films
American black-and-white films
1930 drama films
Films directed by Sam Wood
Metro-Goldwyn-Mayer films
American drama films
1930s English-language films
1930s American films